Việt Hồng may refer to several places in Vietnam:

, a rural commune of Bắc Quang District
Việt Hồng, Hải Dương, a rural commune of Thanh Hà District
, a rural commune of Trấn Yên District